The Carnegie Library in Newton, Kansas is a building from 1903. It was listed on the National Register of Historic Places in 1974.

It was built as a two-story  building;  a  one-story addition was added later.

Harvey County Historical Museum
The Harvey County Historical Museum is now located in the former library.  Opened in 1974, the museum features exhibits about the county's history and culture, offers public programs and speakers, operates the 1873 Kellas School, and houses an archive of historic photos and documents.

References

External links
 Harvey County Historical Museum

Library buildings completed in 1903
Libraries on the National Register of Historic Places in Kansas
Buildings and structures in Harvey County, Kansas
Carnegie libraries in Kansas
National Register of Historic Places in Harvey County, Kansas